Circinus may refer to:

 Circinus, the Latin for a compass (drafting), a tool for drawing arcs and circles
 Circinus (constellation), a small constellation of the southern winter sky, said to resemble a compass
 Circinus Galaxy, a galaxy, also known as ESO 97-G13, in the Circinus constellation